Model-theoretic grammars, also known as constraint-based grammars, contrast with generative grammars in the way they define sets of sentences: they state constraints on syntactic structure rather than providing operations for generating syntactic objects. A generative grammar provides a set of operations such as rewriting, insertion, deletion, movement, or combination, and is interpreted as a definition of the set of all and only the objects that these operations are capable of producing through iterative application. A model-theoretic grammar simply states a set of conditions that an object must meet, and can be regarded as defining the set of all and only the structures of a certain sort that satisfy all of the constraints. The approach applies the mathematical techniques of model theory to the task of syntactic description: a grammar is a theory in the logician's sense (a consistent set of statements) and the well-formed structures are the models that satisfy the theory.

Examples of model-theoretic grammars

The following is a sample of grammars falling under the model-theoretic umbrella:
 the non-procedural variant of Transformational grammar (TG) of George Lakoff, that formulates constraints on potential tree sequences
 Johnson and Postal's formalization of Relational grammar (RG) (1980), Generalized phrase structure grammar (GPSG) in the variants developed by Gazdar et al. (1988), Blackburn et al. (1993) and Rogers (1997)
 Lexical functional grammar (LFG) in the formalization of Ronald Kaplan (1995)
 Head-driven phrase structure grammar (HPSG) in the formalization of King (1999)
 Constraint Handling Rules (CHR) grammars
 The implicit model underlying The Cambridge Grammar of the English Language

Strengths

One benefit of model-theoretic grammars over generative grammars is that they allow for gradience in grammaticality. A structure may deviate only slightly from a theory or it may be highly deviant. Generative grammars, in contrast "entail a sharp boundary between the perfect and the nonexistent, and do not even permit gradience in ungrammaticality to be represented."

References

Grammar
Grammar frameworks
Mathematical logic
Model theory